{{DISPLAYTITLE:C6H7NO3S}}
The molecular formula C6H7NO3S (molar mass: 173.190 g/mol, exact mass: 173.0147 u) may refer to:

 Metanilic acid
 Orthanilic acid
 Piloty's acid
 Sulfanilic acid